Schulenburg is a city in Fayette County, Texas, United States. The population was 2,633 at the 2020 census. Known for its German culture, Schulenburg is home of the Texas Polka Music Museum. It is in a rural, agricultural area settled by German and Czech emigrants in the 1800s.

History
In 1831, the Mexican government granted  of land to Kesiah Crier. Crier's family and the James Lyons family were the first European-American settlers in the area. The town of Schulenburg developed from two nearby communities: Lyons, founded in 1842, and High Hill, settled in 1842 and later named in 1858.

In 1873, the Galveston, Harris and San Antonio Railroad bought land in the area. They built a depot on the portion formerly owned by Louis Schulenburg, and named it after him. The first train arrived on New Year's Eve of 1873, and the town was formally incorporated on May 24, 1875.

Many of the early settlers to Schulenburg and the surrounding area were immigrants of German, Austrian and Czech descent, who came after the Revolutions of 1848 in Europe. The area still shows evidence of their cultures. For instance, local bakeries are noted for their kolaches, a Czech pastry.

Jewish immigrants also made Schulenburg their home, and many of them became merchants. Initially from Germany in the mid-19th century, they were later joined by immigrants from eastern Europe.

The town is the home of Stanzel Flying Models, makers of wire-controlled and free-flight model airplanes for nearly 70 years. Schulenburg is also home to Shaller Go-Karts manufacturing, for use in many tracks around the country.

Geography

It is about 95 miles west of Houston, Texas.

Demographics

As of the 2020 United States census, there were 2,633 people, 964 households, and 600 families residing in the city.

As of the census of 2000, there were 2,699 people, 1,052 households, and 655 families residing in the city. The population density was 427.1/km (1,107.8/mi2). There were 1,226 housing units at an average density of 194.0/km (503.2/mi2). The racial makeup of the city was 76.29% White, 15.45% African American, 0.30% Native American, 0.33% Asian, 0.04% Pacific Islander, 6.04% from other races, and 1.56% from two or more races. Hispanic or Latino of any race were 13.56% of the population.

There were 1,052 households, out of which 26.8% had children under the age of 18 living with them, 46.9% were married couples living together, 11.6% had a female householder with no husband present, and 37.7% were non-families. 34.3% of all households were made up of individuals, and 20.7% had someone living alone who was 65 years of age or older. The average household size was 2.32 and the average family size was 2.96.

In the city, the population was spread out, with 21.7% under the age of 18, 6.6% from 18 to 24, 23.0% from 25 to 44, 21.1% from 45 to 64, and 27.6% who were 65 years of age or older. The median age was 44 years. For every 100 females, there were 82.0 males. For every 100 females age 18 and over, there were 76.0 males.

The median income for a household in the city was $27,619, and the median income for a family was $36,326. Males had a median income of $26,111 versus $20,549 for females. The per capita income for the city was $15,784. About 6.9% of families and 12.5% of the population were below the poverty line, including 13.6% of those under age 18 and 13.5% of those age 65 or over.

Climate

Education

The city is served by the Schulenburg Independent School District and is home to the Schulenburg Shorthorns. St. Rose of Lima Catholic School (grades Pre-K through 8) operates under the guidance of the Diocese of Victoria.

Other educational institutions include a campus of Blinn College, a public junior college.

Media
Schulenburg is served by one local newspaper, The Schulenburg Sticker. The Sticker was founded by German immigrant Ernst Goeth and has been in continuous publication since 1894.

Transportation and Infrastructure 
Schulenburg is located at the general convergence of three major US highways: Interstate 10, U.S. Route 90, and U.S. Route 77. The two US routes form the central intersection of the street, and I-10 flows just north of the city center.

Air travel to Schulenburg is sparse. No general aviation airports exist within five miles of the city centre, and the closest major commercial airports are Austin International, San Antonio International, and the two Houston airports (Hobby International and Bush Intercontinental).

Notable people

 Willis Adams, former wide receiver for the Cleveland Browns of the National Football League
 Hugo Hollas, former football player for the New Orleans Saints and San Francisco 49ers
 E. J. Holub, former football player for the Kansas City Chiefs.
 Lora Lee Michel (born 1940), American child actor
 Joe Mikulik, minor league baseball manager and player

References

External links
 City of Schulenburg official website
 Greater Schulenburg Chamber of Commerce
 Texas State Historical Association
 Schulenburg Sticker, local newspaper
 St. Rose Catholic School

Austrian-American culture in Texas
Cities in Fayette County, Texas
Cities in Texas
Czech-American culture in Texas
German-American culture in Texas
Schulenburg family